The Grand Coulee Bridge, or Columbia River Bridge at Grand Coulee Dam, is a through-cantilever steel truss bridge built in 1934–35. It carries State Route 155 across the Columbia River immediately below Grand Coulee Dam, near the city of Grand Coulee, Washington. It was added to the National Register of Historic Places in 1982.

The bridge was built to transport heavy equipment across the Columbia River during the construction of the dam, and thereafter as a permanent highway bridge. As such, it was designed to carry a heavier load than was typical. During construction, one of the piers began to tilt, probably due to fine glacial material under the gravel. Additional supports were added as a temporary measure. It employed between 1,000 and 1,200 men. The piers were later taken down to bedrock using pneumatic caissons.

See also
List of bridges documented by the Historic American Engineering Record in Washington (state)
List of bridges on the National Register of Historic Places in Washington (state)

References

External links

Grand Coulee Bridge on Archiplanet

Road bridges on the National Register of Historic Places in Washington (state)
Bridges in Grant County, Washington
Historic American Engineering Record in Washington (state)
National Register of Historic Places in Grant County, Washington
Bridges completed in 1935
1935 establishments in Washington (state)
Cantilever bridges in the United States
Steel bridges in the United States
Bridges over the Columbia River